Utrinski vesnik (meaning The Morning in English) is a daily newspaper in the Republic of North Macedonia. The paper was established in 1999. The first issue of Utrinski vesnik was published on 23 June 1999. Its current editor is Erol Rizaov. It is published every day except Sunday. 

In Friday, an addition called Magazin+ comes out together with the newspaper.

References

External links
 Utrinski vesnik's homepage on Internet

Newspapers published in North Macedonia
Macedonian-language newspapers
1999 establishments in the Republic of Macedonia
Publications established in 1999
Mass media in Skopje